Rita Ellis (born  1951) was the first woman elected as mayor of Delray Beach, Florida, USA. She was elected to a two-year term in 2007 but did not seek re-election in 2009 due to health reasons. Ellis had served as a city commissioner in seat one for Delray Beach from 2005 to 2007; she ran for this seat unopposed.

In 2009, Ellis was given the key to the city of Delray Beach.

See also 
 List of first women mayors in the United States
 List of first women mayors

References 

Living people
Florida city council members
Women city councillors in Florida
Women mayors of places in Florida
1950s births
Year of birth missing (living people)
People from Delray Beach, Florida
21st-century American women